International Gladiators 2 was the second international competition of the Gladiators franchise, consisting of seven episodes. The series was filmed at the National Indoor Arena in Birmingham during spring 1996.

Six countries were represented, including United Kingdom, United States, Germany, Russia, Australia, and South Africa. This was the first series to feature the latter three countries, while Finland, who competed in the first International series, did not return for the second competition. While United Kingdom, United States and Australia all had their own domestic series, and sent champion contenders as well as carefully selected Gladiators, the other three countries did not have their own domestic series at the time of filming, although this was not indicated on screen. A total of thirty-six Gladiators competed across the series.

This series became known as the 'season of injury', with five out of the six contender stables suffering from injuries prior to or during competition. The only country not to be affected by contender injuries was the United States. A number of records were broken in the series, including the highest total score for an individual contestant (Peggy in the semi-final) and highest score for games (Swingshot and Powerball).

This was the final series in the Gladiators franchise to feature British Gladiators Jet (Diane Youdale) and Raider (Carlton Headley). Youdale retired following an injury sustained on Pyramid; the injury was so severe that it led to the event being axed the following year. Headley was dropped for reasons undisclosed.

Peggy Odita and Pat Csizmazia emerged as the eventual winners of the series; they represented the United States.

This season also marked the end of the original run of American Gladiators.

Contenders

Gladiators

Shows
The tables show the number of points each contender scored for that event and against which Gladiator.

Heat One

Heat Two

Notes

Heat Three

Heat Four
Heat Four consisted of a second chance for the three countries that did not have a contender win through in the previous three heats.
The contender with the lowest score after three games was eliminated from the competition.

Notes

Semi Final 1

Notes

Semi Final 2

Notes

Grand Final

Notes

Broadcasts

References

Gladiators (franchise)